Ljubomir Stojanović (sometimes mentioned as Ljuba Stojanovic) (6 August 1860, Užice – 16 June 1930) was a Serbian politician, philologist and academic.

Biography
Stojanović was a philologist and historian, who graduated from the School of Philosophy at the Grandes écoles (the Grandes Écoles). After studies in Belgrade he went on to post-graduate studies in Vienna, St. Petersburg and Leipzig. At first a grammar school professor, he was appointed university professor at his alma mater, the Grandes éecoles (1891-1899). Opposed to the royal absolutism of King Aleksandar I Obrenović, Stojanović joined the People's Radical Party of Nikola Pašić in 1897.

After the split with the older generation of Radicals who accepted the compromise with the Crown in 1901, Stojanović led the younger group of Radicals, a semi-independent faction since 1901 which eventually became independent in 1905.As a founding member and a leader of the Independent Radical Party in Serbia, Stojanović was several times Minister of Education and Religious Affairs (1903, 1904, 1906, 1909), and Prime Minister from 29 May 1905 to 14 March 1906, during the 'Golden Age of Serbia' (1903-1914) , under the democratic and constitutional rule of King Peter I Karađorđević.

After the First World War Stojanović was one of the founders of the Yugoslav Republican Party and its first president.  Stojanović was often described as a puritan moralist in politics.

Secretary of the Serbian Royal Academy, future Serbian Academy of Sciences and Arts from 1913 to 1923, Stojanović was very prolific in various scientific fields: he published a dozen volumes of medieval Serbian manuscripts and documents: Miroslavljevo Jevandjelje (Miroslav Gospel), Stari srpski zapisi i natpisi (Old Serbian inscriptions and records) (6 vol.), medieval Serbian charters and letters as well as medieval Serbian genealogies and annals. Stojanović published the catalogues of medieval Serbian manuscripts and old books in the National Library of Serbia in Belgrade as well as the catalogue of manuscript collection at the Serbian Royal Academy.

A scholar of enormous erudition, energy and determination, Stojanović published 17 volumes of works of Vuk St. Karadžić, the main reformer of the Serbian alphabet, including several volumes of his extensive correspondence. Stojanović wrote grammar textbooks for Serbian secondary schools, published important scholarly studies of old Serbian printing MA, Serbian churches from 15th to 16th century, the Archbishop Danilo II. His most important scholarly work is an extensive and detailed biography of Vuk St. Karadžić, based on mostly unused sources.

Selected works
Lekcije iz srpskoga jezika za I razred gimnazije, sastavio Ljub. Stojanović, Belgrade, u Državnoj štampariji kraljevine Srbije, 1891.
Katalog rukopisa i starih štampanih knjiga, zbirka Srpske Kraljevske Akademije, sast. Ljub. Stojanović, Srpska kraljevska akademija, Belgrade, Državna štamparija, 1901.
Miroslavljevo jevanđelje ( Évangéliaire ancien serbe du prince Miroslav), Preface (in Serbian and French) and notes (pp. 203–229) by Ljubomir Stojanović. - "Édition de sa majesté Alexandre I roi de Serbie" p. [iv], Fotografska reprodukcija  i štampa c. i k. dvorskog umetničkog zavoda Angerera i Gešla, Vienna, 1897.
Katalog Narodne biblioteke u Beogradu, Rukopisi i stare štampane knjige, edited by Ljomir Stojanović, Belgrade, Državna štamparija 1903.
Republikanski pogledi na nekoliko savremenih pitanja, Ljub. Stojanović, Belgrade, Geca Kon Publishing House, 1920.
Stari srpski rodoslovi i letopisi, par Ljubomir Stojanović, Sremski Karlovci, Srpska kraljevska akademija, 1927.
Stari srpski zapisi i natpisi, vol. I- VI, edited and composed byLjubomir Stojanović, Srpska kraljevska akademija, Sremski Karlovci, Srpska manastirska štamparijia, 1926.
Stare srpske povelje i pisma. Knjiga I, Dubrovnik i susedi njegovi. Drugi deo, edited and composed by Ljubomir Stojanović, Belgrade - Sremski Karlovci, Srpska manastirska štamparijia, 1934.
Život i rad Vuka Stefanovića Karadžića (26. okt. 1787 - 26. jan. 1864), Belgrade, Geca Kon Publishing House, 1924, XXIV-783 p.
Srpska gramatika za III razred gimnazije, Belgrade, Geca Kon Publishing House, 1921.

Legacy
He is included in The 100 most prominent Serbs.

See also
 Milan Kašanin
 Vladimir Petković
 Đurađ Bošković
 Stevan Dimitrijević
 Nikodim Kondakov
 Ljuba Kovačević
 Radoslav Grujic
 Vladimir Ćorović
 Alexander Soloviev

Bibliography
 Milan Grol: "The Temptations of democracy", Službeni Glasnik, 2006.
 Dušan T. Bataković, Yougoslavie. Nations, religions, idéologies, Lausanne, L'Age d'Homme; 1994.
 

1860 births
1930 deaths
Politicians from Užice
People from the Principality of Serbia
People's Radical Party politicians
Yugoslav Republican Party politicians
Prime Ministers of Serbia
Academic staff of Belgrade Higher School
Interior ministers of Serbia